Voice of Eye is a Taos, New Mexico based experimental ambient music duo whose members are Bonnie McNaim and Jim Wilson. Formed in 1989 in Houston, Texas, their sound is one that blends electronic soundscapes, dark ambient, drone, and world music, particularly with Middle Eastern overtones, and tends to evoke an atmospheric or shamanistic quality. Many of the instruments used are home-made or heavily modified. Using this "odd palette of instrumentation," their music has been described as "largely indescribable, but totally inviting."

A ten-year musical hiatus began in 1997 as the duo shifted their focus from music to building an off-the-grid sustainable earthship and studio in New Mexico. They returned to touring and recording music in 2007.

History
Bonnie McNairn and Jim Wilson first began performing together in the experimental band Cruor with Ure Thrall and Tim Sternat in 1988. Ure Thrall and Jim Wilson originally formed Cruor in 1987 with a revolving lineup of members based on who had a PA system. Following the crucifixion of Ure Thrall, Sternat, Wilson and McNairn formed Esoterica Landscapes 7. This was an industrial noise band based around the embrace of chaos and "majik". Eventually the embrace of these elements took its toll and Voice of Eye was formed as a vehicle to explore profound aspects of consciousness using music as a shared tool for entering different states of being. “The motivation behind forming Voice of Eye was for us to connect to a deeper truth we first sensed within our music. This unformed presence first revealed itself to us through music and has continued to manifest, taking shape throughout our life’s journey and leading to profound mystery.”

Method
Voice of Eye process real-time acoustic events through electronic devices and digital manipulation to achieve their signature sonic atmospheres. They invent and construct many of the instruments heard on their recordings. The use of non-traditional, found, misappropriated, primal, and world instruments also play a prominent role in their music.

McNairn and Wilson feel that the physical translation of movement and breath into sound cannot be equaled. “To literally touch the vibration, to feel it in your body, is a magical feedback to the source of all sound, the timeless vibration of the Universe.”

Discography
2021, Anthology Three 1996-1998, Double CD, Double Cassette, Hand painted wooden box, amulet, ritual items, Black Mara Records
2021, Hearts in Darkness, Digital Release, Conundrum Unlimited
2021, IAMINDUST2008, Digital Release, Conundrum Unlimited
2012, The Unveiling of Darkness, Voice of Eye and Thomas Dimuzio, CD, 6-Panel Digipack, Record Label Records RLR-35, USA
2011, Anthology Two 1992–1996, Double CD, Transgredient Records
2010, Anthology One 1989–1991, Double LP, Vinyl On Demand
2010, The Portland Improvisations, Conundrum Unlimited
2010, Fire of the Unitive Path::the three rivers::, NVVOE: Nux Vomica and Voice of Eye, CD, Full Color Artwork, Auricular Records auricd41 and Conundrum Unlimited cu4, USA
2010, Primaera, Voice of Eye, Mini CDr, Full Color Disc, Taalem alm62, France
2010, Emergence & Immersion, Voice of Eye, Double CD, Color 4-page Digifolder, Old Europa Cafe OECD123, Italy
2009, Actualization, Troum / AsiaNova / Voice of Eye   Also:  Troum / S.Q.E. / Ure Thrall, CD, Live Collaborations 2007 and 2001, Discorporeality Recordings CD2, USA
2009, Seven Directions Divergent, CD, color Digipack, Conundrum Unlimited
2009, Substantia Innominata, 10" record, 39 minutes, clear vinyl with golden speckles, Limited Edition of 500, Drone Records
2007, Nicht-Wissen, Voice of Eye and Asia Nova, mini CDR, special edition of 100 for 2007 Tour, Old Europa Cafe
2007, Emergence: Improvisations Volume 1, CDR, special edition of 100 for 2007 Tour, Conundrum Unlimited
2007, Immersion: Improvisations Volume 2, CDR, special edition of 100 for 2007 Tour, Conundrum Unlimited
1999, The Nature of Sand, Illusion of Safety, Life Garden and Voice of Eye, CD, Manifold Records
1997, Live LASF, LP, Anomalous Records
1996, Narratives: Music for Fiction, Paul Schutze, Robert Rich and Voice of Eye, CD, Manifold Records
1995, Transmigration, CD, Cyclotron Industries
1995, Tryst #8, Big City Orchestra and Voice of Eye, Cassette, (Special Packaging of Many Things), UBUIBI
1995, The Hungry Void, Volume Two: Air, Life Garden and Voice of Eye, CD, Agni Music and Cyclotron Industries
1995, The Hungry Void, Volume One: Fire, Life Garden and Voice of Eye, CD, Agni Music and Cyclotron Industries
1995, Sprocket, 7" vinyl, Drone Records
1994, Vespers, CD, Cyclotron Industries
1992, Mariner Sonique, CD, Cyclotron Industries
1992, Resonant Fields/Hot Gypsy Fink, 90 minute Cassette, Cyclotron Industries
1991, Voice of Eye, 90 minute Cassette, Cyclotron Industries
1990, Isolation, 90 minute Cassette, Cyclotron Industries

See also 
List of ambient music artists

References

External links
Voice of Eye website
Bandcamp
YouTube
Facebook
MySpace Page

American experimental musical groups
American ambient music groups